The 1970 Ottawa Rough Riders finished the season in 4th place in the Eastern Conference with a 4–10 record in their first season without Frank Clair as head coach after he served 14 seasons in that capacity. Jack Gotta, who was an assistant with Ottawa from 1967 to 1969 became head coach. The Rough Riders finished the season out of the playoffs and failed to defend their back-to-back Grey Cup titles.

Preseason

Regular season

Standings

Schedule

Player stats

Defence

Awards and honours
Al Marcelin, Defensive Back, CFL All-Star

References

Ottawa Rough Riders seasons
1970 Canadian Football League season by team